Litoprosopus is a genus of moths in the subfamily Dyopsinae of the family Erebidae.

Species
 Litoprosopus bahamensis Hampson, 1926
 Litoprosopus coachella Hill, 1921
 Litoprosopus confligens Walker, 1857
 Litoprosopus futilis Grote & Robinson, 1868
 Litoprosopus haitiensis Hampson, 1926
 Litoprosopus hatuey (Poey, 1832)
 Litoprosopus puncticosta Hampson, 1926

References

Moth genera